Rhinoteratura
is a genus of Asian bush crickets belonging to the tribe Meconematini in the new subtribe Meconematina.  The genus was erected by AV Gorochov in 1993 as a subgenus of Leptoteratura (Rhinoteratura); he uprated it to genus level in 2022.  Species are recorded from Japan, China (including Taiwan), Vietnam, and west Malesia (but this may be incomplete).

Species 
The Orthoptera Species File lists the following:
 Rhinoteratura capreola (Redtenbacher, 1891)
 Rhinoteratura chaseni (Karny, 1926) (synonym Leptoteratura borneoensis (Jin, 1995))
 Rhinoteratura chela (Tan, Gorochov & Wahab, 2017)
 Rhinoteratura kailingensis (Jin, 2020)
 Rhinoteratura ketambe Gorochov, 2022
 Rhinoteratura lamellata (Mao & Shi, 2007)
 Rhinoteratura pseudocapreola Gorochov, 2022
 Rhinoteratura pulchra (Gorochov, 2008)
 Rhinoteratura raoani (Gorochov, 2008)
 Rhinoteratura sakaii (Jin, 2020)
 Rhinoteratura sharovi (Gorochov, 1993)- type species (as Leptoteratura sharovi Gorochov) locality: near Tam Dao, Vinh Phu Province, Vietnam
 Rhinoteratura symmetrica (Yamasaki, 1988)
 Rhinoteratura uniformis (Gorochov, 2008)

References

External links

Tettigoniidae genera
Meconematinae
Orthoptera of Asia